Brett Sinkbeil (born December 26, 1984) is an American former professional baseball pitcher. He played in Major League Baseball (MLB) for the Florida Marlins.

Baseball career

Amateur
Sinkbeil was drafted by the St. Louis Cardinals in the 38th round of the 2003 Major League Baseball Draft out of Charles Page High School, but he chose not to sign. He attended Missouri State University, and in 2005 he played collegiate summer baseball with the Falmouth Commodores of the Cape Cod Baseball League where he was named a league all-star. He was drafted by the Florida Marlins in the first round of the 2006 Major League Baseball Draft and signed June 16, 2006.

Florida Marlins
Sinkbeil was drafted by the Florida Marlins in the first round of the 2006 Major League Baseball Draft out of Missouri State University. Sinkbeil was named the #77 prospect in baseball by Baseball America before the 2007 season. On July 16, 2007, while pitching for the Jupiter Hammerheads, Sinkbeil was named Florida State League co-pitcher of the week, sharing the award with Phil Coke. Sinkbeil was named the #68 prospect in baseball by Baseball America before the 2008 season. The Marlins added Sinkbeil to the 40-man roster in November 2009 to protect him from the Rule 5 Draft. On September 15, 2010, Sinkbeil made his MLB debut for the Florida Marlins against the Philadelphia Phillies. He faced only one batter, getting Roy Halladay to ground out. He was released by the Marlins at the end of the team's 2011 Spring Training camp.

Pittsburgh Pirates
On April 20, 2011, Sinkbeil signed a minor league contract with the Pittsburgh Pirates. In 2011, he played for the Pirates High Class-A affiliate, the Bradenton Marauders and the Pirates Double-A affiliate, the Altoona Curve. He was granted free agency after the 2011 season.

References

External links

1984 births
Living people
Baseball players from Tucson, Arizona
Bradenton Marauders players
Carolina Mudcats players
Florida Marlins players
Greensboro Grasshoppers players
Jamestown Jammers players
Jupiter Hammerheads players
New Orleans Zephyrs players
Altoona Curve players
Baseball players from Oklahoma
Sportspeople from Tulsa, Oklahoma
Missouri State Bears baseball players
Falmouth Commodores players